Luka Bukić (born 20 April 1994) is a water polo player from Croatia. He was part of the Croatian team at the 2016 Summer Olympics, where the team won the silver medal.

Club:

Mladost (2011-2018,2019-2021)
Honours:
Regional Waterpolo League(1)  2019-20

Croatian Cup(4) 2010-11,2011-12  2019-20,2020-21

Croatian championship(1)  2020-21

Jadran(2021-now)
Honours
Croatian Cup (1)  2021-22

Pro Recco  2018-2019
Italia champiomship(1)  2018-19
Italian Cup(1)           2018-19

See also
 Croatia men's Olympic water polo team records and statistics
 List of Olympic medalists in water polo (men)
 List of World Aquatics Championships medalists in water polo

References

External links
 

1994 births
Living people
Sportspeople from Zagreb
Croatian male water polo players
Water polo drivers
Water polo players at the 2016 Summer Olympics
Medalists at the 2016 Summer Olympics
Olympic silver medalists for Croatia in water polo
World Aquatics Championships medalists in water polo
Competitors at the 2013 Mediterranean Games
Mediterranean Games medalists in water polo
Mediterranean Games gold medalists for Croatia
Water polo players at the 2020 Summer Olympics
Croatian expatriate sportspeople in Italy
Expatriate water polo players